Prokhorovsky District is an administrative district (raion), one of the twenty-one in Belgorod Oblast, Russia. Municipally, it is incorporated as Prokhorovsky Municipal District. It is located in the north of the oblast. Its administrative center is the urban locality (a settlement) of Prokhorovka. Population:   31,847 (2002 Census);  The population of Prokhorovka accounts for 36.1% of the district's total population.

References

Notes

Sources

Districts of Belgorod Oblast